David Bowman (born 10 March 1964) is a Scottish football coach and former player. In a 12-year career with Dundee United he played in the 1987 UEFA Cup Final and won the 1993–94 Scottish Cup. At United he was also a three time Scottish Cup runner up.

He also played for Heart of Midlothian, Coventry City, Raith Rovers and Forfar Athletic as well as having a spell in Hong Kong with Yee Hope FC. He played six times for the Scotland national football team and was a non-playing squad member at UEFA Euro 1992. Since 2007 he has worked as a community coach at Dundee United.

Early life
Dave Bowman was born in Royal Tunbridge Wells, Kent, England on 10 March 1964. He is the son of Scottish footballer Andy Bowman, formerly of Chelsea and Heart of Midlothian (Hearts), who was playing for Tonbridge at the time of his son's birth. The family subsequently moved to Edinburgh, where Dave grew up. He played youth football for Salvesen Boys Club before signing for his father's former club, Hearts, in June 1980.

Playing career

Club
Bowman started his senior career with Hearts, making 116 league appearances before leaving in 1984. He moved to Coventry City for two seasons where he was joined by Jim McInally, signing from Nottingham Forest. They left together in 1986, joining Dundee United for a combined £140,000 transfer fee and reached the 1987 UEFA Cup Final in their first season therebeating Barcelona home and away in the quarter-finals and then eliminating Borussia Mönchengladbach in the semi-finals. They lost 2–1 on aggregate in the final against IFK Göteborg.

Bowman and McInally played in three losing Dundee United Scottish Cup final teams. These were in 1987 to St Mirren, 1988 to Celtic and in the 1991 final to Motherwell in which Bowman scored. They collected winners' medals from the 1994 Scottish Cup Final against Rangers. Bowman is ranked tenth on United's all-time appearance list.

Bowman spent the latter part of his playing career at Raith Rovers, Hong Kong club Yee Hope and finally Forfar Athletic. While at Forfar he received a Scottish record seven-game suspension, imposed for swearing at the match officials.

International
Bowman made six full international appearances for Scotland between March 1992 and September 1993. He was part of Scotland's UEFA Euro 1992 finals squad, but was not selected for any of his team's three games.

Coaching career
As Forfar were a part-time club, Bowman was able to join the coaching staff at Dundee United, where he continued to serve the club until he left following Craig Brewster's appointment as manager in 2006. After a brief spell as a pundit for BBC Radio Scotland's  Sportsound programme, he returned to coaching when old friend John Robertson invited him to be his assistant at Livingston. Following his spell in Livingston, Bowman moved to Dens Park to work alongside Gordon Wallace as youth coach. In October 2007, Bowman returned to Tannadice for a third time, accepting an invitation as community coach.

On 28 September 2015, Bowman took temporary charge of Dundee United's first-team squad in the wake of manager Jackie McNamara's departure from the club.

Career statistics

Honours

Dundee United
 Scottish Cup: 1993–94
 Runner-up 1986–87, 1987–88, 1990–91
 UEFA Cup: Runner-up 1986–87
 Scottish League Cup: Runner-up 1997–98

See also
 List of footballers in Scotland by number of league appearances (500+)
 List of Scotland international footballers born outside Scotland

References

External links
 
 Hearts career stats from London Hearts website

1964 births
Living people
People from Royal Tunbridge Wells
Anglo-Scots
Scottish footballers
Scottish football managers
Scottish Football League players
Scotland international footballers
Heart of Midlothian F.C. players
Coventry City F.C. players
Dundee United F.C. players
Scottish expatriate sportspeople in Hong Kong
Raith Rovers F.C. players
Yee Hope players
Forfar Athletic F.C. players
Livingston F.C. managers
UEFA Euro 1992 players
Dundee United F.C. non-playing staff
Scottish expatriate footballers
Expatriate footballers in Hong Kong
Livingston F.C. non-playing staff
Dundee F.C. non-playing staff
Association football defenders
Association football midfielders